Turtle Creek is a borough in Allegheny County, Pennsylvania, United States,  southeast of Pittsburgh. The population was 5,114 at the 2020 census. George Westinghouse constructed a manufacturing plant nearby. Turtle Creek takes its name from a small stream that flows into the Monongahela River. Before white settlers arrived, there was a small village of Native Americans living there from the Turtle Clan of the Iroquois Nation. (See: East Pittsburgh and Wilmerding.)

Geography
Turtle Creek is located at  (40.408018, -79.821802).

Neighboring municipalities
Turtle Creek has five borders, including Wilkins Township to the west and north, Monroeville to the east, Wilmerding to the southeast, North Versailles Township to the south, and East Pittsburgh to the southwest.

Demographics

As of the census of 2000, there were 6,076 people, 2,717 households, and 1,516 families residing in the borough. The population density was 6,205.2 people per square mile (2,393.8/km2). There were 2,969 housing units at an average density of 3,032.1 per square mile (1,169.7/km2). The racial makeup of the borough was 92.71% White, 5.17% African American, 0.08% Native American, 0.61% Asian, 0.15% from other races, and 1.28% from two or more races. Hispanic or Latino of any race were 0.61% of the population.

There were 2,717 households, out of which 23.4% had children under the age of 18 living with them, 37.7% were married couples living together, 14.5% had a female householder with no husband present, and 44.2% were non-families. 39.2% of all households were made up of individuals, and 17.4% had someone living alone who was 65 years of age or older. The average household size was 2.16 and the average family size was 2.91.

In the borough the population was spread out, with 20.1% under the age of 18, 8.1% from 18 to 24, 28.1% from 25 to 44, 21.8% from 45 to 64, and 21.9% who were 65 years of age or older. The median age was 40 years. For every 100 females there were 81.4 males. For every 100 females age 18 and over, there were 78.8 males.

The median income for a household in the borough was $30,057, and the median income for a family was $43,975. Males had a median income of $28,859 versus $23,581 for females. The per capita income for the borough was $17,552. About 10.5% of families and 11.3% of the population were below the poverty line, including 15.0% of those under age 18 and 12.5% of those age 65 or over.

In 1900, 3,262 people lived here; in 1910, 4,995 people lived here, and in 1940, 9,805 people lived in Turtle Creek. The population was 6,076 at the 2000 census.

Culture
The 1960s harmony-pop vocal group the Vogues originated in Turtle Creek.

Actor Ron Harper was born in Turtle Creek.

Government and politics

Notable people
H. Alberta Colclaser, lawyer
Ron Harper, actor
Leon Hart, football player
 Michael J Estocin , Vietnam War Medal of Honor Recipient

References

External links

Populated places established in 1892
Pittsburgh metropolitan area
Boroughs in Allegheny County, Pennsylvania
1892 establishments in Pennsylvania